Frydrychowo  is a village in the administrative district of Gmina Więcbork, within Sępólno County, Kuyavian-Pomeranian Voivodeship, in north-central Poland.

The village has a population of 50.

References

Villages in Sępólno County